Mohammadabad (also Romanized as Moḩammadābād; also known as Moḩammadābād-e Jereh) is a village in Jereh Rural District, Jereh and Baladeh District, Kazerun County, Fars Province, Iran. At the 2006 census, its population was 148, in 29 families.

References 

Populated places in Kazerun County